Catocyclotis aemulius is a species of butterfly in the family Riodinidae. It is found in Brazil and Ecuador.

References

Nymphidiini
Butterflies described in 1793
Taxa named by Johan Christian Fabricius